Grosshans is a surname of German origin, meaning "large Hans", referring to a large man named Hans. Notable people with the surname include:

Frank Grosshans (born 1942), American mathematician
Jamie Grosshans (born 1978/1979), American judge

See also
Grosshans subgroup, an algebraic subgroup